Media policy / M. politics is a term describing all legislation and political action directed towards regulating the media, especially mass media, and the media industry. Those actions will usually be prompted by pressures from public opinion or from industry interest groups.

Print media, public radio and television broadcasting, mobile communications all converge in the digital infrastructure. This digitalisation produces markets that still lack consistent and rigorous regulation. In instances where regulations exist, technical innovations outpace and overtake existing rules and give rise to illegal activities like copyright violations. This has to be dealt with to defend intellectual property rights (see e.g. Digital Economy Act 2010)

Media politics is the subject of studies in media research and cultural studies.

Conflicting interests
Liberal media policy is adversely affected by the fact that political success itself hinges critically on favorable comments in the media, see politico-media complex.

Social media

Literature

See also

References

External links

Mass media
Policy